Stinking Lake (also known as Burford Lake) is a lake in Rio Arriba County, New Mexico, in the United States.

Stinking is likely borrowed from the Tewa-language name.

References

Lakes of New Mexico
Lakes of Rio Arriba County, New Mexico